Silas Weir Mitchell (born Silas Weir Mitchell Neilson; September 30, 1969) is an American character actor. He is known for starring as Charles "Haywire" Patoshik in the Fox television series Prison Break (2005–2007), for the recurring role of Donny Jones in My Name Is Earl (2005–2009), and as Monroe in the NBC television series Grimm (2011–2017).

Early life and education
Mitchell was born and raised in Philadelphia, Pennsylvania. He is named after an ancestor, the 19th century physician and author Silas Weir Mitchell.

He attended The Montgomery County Day School (formerly in Gladwyne, Pennsylvania) for his elementary school years; is a graduate of St. Paul's School, a college-preparatory boarding school in Concord, New Hampshire, (1987); Brown University (1991) in Rhode Island, where he majored in Theatre and Religion; and the University of California San Diego, Master of Fine Arts graduate acting program.

After graduating from Brown, he spent some time in New York City, acting in minor theatre productions.

Career
Mitchell has had recurring guest roles in such television series as 24 as Eli Stram; Numb3rs; My Name Is Earl as Earl's ex-con friend Donny Jones; and Prison Break as escapee Charles "Haywire" Patoshik. On the DVD commentary for Prison Break, he mentions he had previously auditioned for the roles of Theodore "T-Bag" Bagwell and Lincoln Burrows. Mitchell plays the role of an insane prison inmate in both Prison Break and My Name Is Earl. He also appears in Rat Race (2001) as Lloyd (The Hardware Store Guy), and in The Whole Ten Yards as Yermo.

One of his most notable roles is that of mentally unstable recurring character James Hogan on Cold Case. Mitchell also made appearances on CSI: Miami, CSI: NY, Law & Order: SVU, Burn Notice as charming but unstable arms dealer Seymour, Dexter, Monk, Six Feet Under, X-Files, The Closer, and Boomtown. He also appeared on the show CSI in the Season 6 episode "Room Service".

In 2008, Silas made an appearance in seventh and final season of the U.S. cop show The Shield.

In 2009, he appeared in A Fork in the Road, alongside Jaime King, and in Halloween 2. Mitchell also appeared in Fox's TV show, Mental with Chris Vance, also from Prison Break.

In October 2011, Mitchell was cast as Monroe in the NBC TV series Grimm.

Filmography

References

External links
 

1969 births
Living people
20th-century American male actors
21st-century American male actors
American male film actors
American male television actors
Brown University alumni
Male actors from Philadelphia
University of California, San Diego alumni